Volleyball is one of the sports that is played at the Summer Olympic Games in two disciplines: the traditional six-per-side indoor game, and the newer game of beach volleyball.  Indoor volleyball was added to the Olympic programme in 1957 at the 53rd session of the International Olympic Committee (IOC) in Sofia, Bulgaria, and the first competitions were held at the 1964 Summer Olympics in Tokyo. The Soviet Union won a medal in both the men's and women's competition at the first five Olympics that included volleyball, including the men's gold medal in Tokyo.  The Japanese women's team won the gold at the inaugural Olympic volleyball competition, and the silver at the following two Games. The Montreal Games of 1976 saw the Polish men win the nation's only gold medal in the sport, after the women had won bronze in 1964 and 1968.  At the 1980 Moscow Olympics, the hosts won gold in both competitions.  The Bulgarian team won their only two volleyball medals in Moscow, a silver and a bronze in the men's and women's tournament, respectively. The United States won its first medals in volleyball at the Los Angeles Games: a gold in the men's competition, and a silver in the women's.  The People's Republic of China won the gold medal in the women's competition in Los Angeles, their first time participating in an Olympic volleyball competition. The United States successfully defended their men's gold medal at the 1988 Summer Olympics in Seoul, and Peru won their only medal in volleyball, a silver in the women's competition. The Soviet Union won a silver medal in the men's competition and a gold in the women's at what would be their final Olympics. Following the 1990–91 breakup of the Soviet Union, 12 of the 15 newly independent countries competed together as the Unified Team in Barcelona.  In the women's competition, the Unified Team won the silver medal, and Cuba won their first of three consecutive gold medals. In the men's competition, Brazil won its first gold medal, and the Netherlands its first overall medal in the sport.

On 18 September 1993, at the 101st IOC session in Monte Carlo, the Committee voted to add beach volleyball for both men and women to the Olympic programme effective with the 1996 Atlanta Games.  A National Olympic Committee is permitted to enter two teams in the beach volleyball tournament; a rule that allowed the United States and Brazil to win both gold and silver in men's and women's beach volleyball respectively that year.  Atlanta also saw the Dutch men's indoor team improve their Barcelona silver to a gold.  At the 2000 Sydney Olympics, the host Australian team won the gold medal in the women's beach volleyball competition, and the Russian Federation took home its first volleyball medals as an independent country with silver in both indoor competitions. At the 2004 Athens Olympics, Spain won its only medal in volleyball, a silver in the men's beach volleyball competition. In women's beach volleyball, the United States team of Misty May (now May-Treanor) and Kerri Walsh (now Walsh Jennings) won the first of three consecutive gold medals, the only team to defend a beach volleyball gold medal.  At the 2008 Beijing Olympics, the United States men's indoor team won all their matches on the way to their third gold medal win. This equalled the former Soviet Union's record for the most men's championships.  The Soviets won twelve medals in the indoor competition, and Brazilian teams have won thirteen medals in beach competition; respectively the most in each discipline. The Brazilian teams, however, with ten indoor medals lead all nations with a total of twenty medals in volleyball events at the Olympics.

Six athletes have each won four medals in volleyball. Cuban Ana Fernández and American Kerri Walsh Jennings each have three gold and one bronze, Soviet Inna Ryskal and Brazilian Sérgio Santos have two gold and two silver medals, Russian Sergey Tetyukhin has one gold, one silver, and two bronzes, and Italian Samuele Papi has two silvers and two bronzes. Ten athletes have won three gold medals. Seven, including Fernández, were members of the Cuban women's indoor team that won consecutive golds in 1992, 1996 and 2000. May-Treanor and Walsh Jennings, as noted above, won beach volleyball gold medals in 2004, 2008 and 2012. The other is Karch Kiraly, who won gold with the United States men's indoor team in 1984 and 1988 and in beach volleyball in 1996. Kiraly is the only player of either gender to win medals in both indoor and beach volleyball. Kiraly is also one of four people that have won medals both as a player and coach. Apart from May-Treanor and Walsh Jennings of the United States, Ricardo Santos and Emanuel Rego of Brazil are the only athletes with three medals in beach volleyball. They have one gold and one bronze as a team, and each has one silver with other partners.

Volleyball (indoor)

Men

Women

Beach volleyball

Men

Women

Statistics

Medal leaders
Athletes who have won three or more medals are listed below.

Medals as coach and player (indoor only)

Only four volleyball players won medals and then coached indoor teams to the podium. Aside from Lang Ping, who led the United States' women to the silver in 2008, all were managers of their own country's team.

See also

 Lists of Olympic medalists

Notes

2. Several of the names listed here are spelled differently from in the corresponding Wikipedia article. This article follows the spelling given in the IOC's database of medal winners.
3. Some Brazilian players are better known by their apelidos (nicknames) than their birth names, and may have Wikipedia articles at those locations instead of their birth names.

References

General

Specific

medalists

Volleyball
Olympics